Naarda ivelona is a species of moth in the family Noctuidae from Madagascar. It was described by Pierre Viette in 1965.

Its holotype had been collected in the Ivelona valley and is preserved at the MNHN.

References

Herminiinae
Moths of Madagascar
Moths of Africa
Moths described in 1965